Fort Brockhurst railway station served the town of Gosport, Hampshire, England from 1865 to 1953 on the Fareham-Gosport line.

History 
The station opened on 1 November 1865 as Brockhurst by the London and South Western Railway. It was situated on the east side of Military Road. The station's name was changed to Fort Brockhurst on 17 November 1893 to avoid confusion with  station in Hampshire. It originally had two platforms but a third one was built when the Lee-on-the-Solent branch opened in 1894. Most of the traffic handled at the station was naval or military related. Passenger services that ran on the Lee-on-Solent Line ceased on 1 January 1931. The station closed to both passengers and goods traffic on 8 June 1953.

References

External links 

Disused railway stations in Hampshire
Railway stations in Great Britain opened in 1865
Railway stations in Great Britain closed in 1953
1865 establishments in England
1953 disestablishments in England
Former London and South Western Railway stations